This is the Electoral history of Charles Rangel, a Democratic Representative from New York City, who represented the 18th, 19th, 16th, 15th, and 13th districts of New York. Rangel was first elected in November 1970, and was re-elected in every subsequent election. Rangel chose not to run in the 2016 House election, and retired when his term ended in January 2017. At the time of his retirement, he was the second most senior United States Representative, behind representative John Conyers.

|+ : Results 1970
! Year
!
! Subject
! Party
! Votes
! %
!
! Opponent
! Party
! Votes
! %
!
! Opponent
! Party
! Votes
! %
!
! Opponent
! Party
! Votes
! %
!
|-
|1970
||
| |Charles Rangel
| |Democratic, Republican
| |52,651
| |87%
|
|! style="background:#CC0000; "|Charles Taylor
|! style="background:#CC0000; "|Liberal
|! style="background:#CC0000; "|6,385
|! style="background:#CC0000; "|11%
|
| |Bohdan Wasiutynski
| |Conservative
| |1,033
| |2%
|
||Jose Stevens
||Communist
||347
||1%
|

|+ : Results 1972–1980
! Year
!
! Subject
! Party
! Votes
! %
!
! Opponent
! Party
! Votes
! %
!
! Opponent
! Party
! Votes
! %
|-
|1972
||
| |Charles Rangel
| |Democratic, Republican, Liberal
| |104,427
| |96%
|
| |Marshall Dodge
| |Conservative
| |2,517
| |1%
|
||Jose Stevens
||Communist
||843
||1%
|-
|1974
||
| |Charles Rangel
| |Democratic, Republican, Liberal
| |63,146
| |97%
|
| |Charles Mills
| |Conservative
| |2,039
| |3%
|
|
|
|
|
|-
|1976
||
| |Charles Rangel
| |Democratic, Republican, Liberal
| |91,672
| |97%
|
| |Benton Cole
| |Conservative
| |2,169
| |2%
|
| |Helen Halyard
| |Workers
| |640
| |1%
|-
|1978
||
| |Charles Rangel
| |Democratic, Republican, Liberal
| |91,672
| |96%
|
| |F. Freeman Yearling
| |Conservative
| |1,648
| |3%
|
| |Kenneth Miliner
| |Socialist Workers
| |612
| |0%
|-
|1980
||
| |Charles Rangel
| |Democratic, Republican, Liberal
| |84,062
| |96%
|
| |Marjorie Garvey
| |Conservative, Right to Life
| |2,622
| |3%
|
| |Reba Dixon
| |Socialist Workers
| |692
| |1%
|-

|+ : Results 1982–1990
! Year
!
! Subject
! Party
! Votes
! %
!
! Opponent
! Party
! Votes
! %
!
! Opponent
! Party
! Votes
! %
|-
|1982
||
| |Charles Rangel
| |Democratic, Republican, Liberal
| |76,626
| |97%
|
| |Michael Berns
| |Conservative
| |1,261
| |2%
|
| |Veronica Cruz
| |Socialist Workers
| |718
| |1%
|-
|1984
||
| |Charles Rangel
| |Democratic, Republican
| |117,759
| |97%
|
| |Michael Berns
| |Conservative
| |2,541
| |2%
|
| |Nan Bailey
| |Socialist Workers
| |1,098
| |1%
|-
|1986
||
| |Charles Rangel
| |Democratic, Republican, Liberal
| |61,262
| |96%
|
| |Michael Berns
| |Conservative
| |1,288
| |2%
|
|! style="background:#FF00FF; "|William Seraile
|! style="background:#FF00FF; "|New Alliance
|! style="background:#FF00FF; "|995
|! style="background:#FF00FF; "|2%
|-
|1988
||
| |Charles Rangel
| |Democratic, Republican, Liberal
| |107,620
| |97%
|
| |Michael Liccione
| |Conservative
| |1,779
| |2%
|
|! style="background:#FF00FF; "|Barbara Taylor
|! style="background:#FF00FF; "|New Alliance
|! style="background:#FF00FF; "|1,451
|! style="background:#FF00FF; "|1%
|-
|1990
||
| |Charles Rangel
| |Democratic, Republican, Libertarian
| |55,882
| |97%
|
|! style="background:#FF00FF; "|Alvaader Frazier
|! style="background:#FF00FF; "|New Alliance
|! style="background:#FF00FF; "|1,592
|! style="background:#FF00FF; "|3%
|
|
|
|
|
|-

|+ : Results 1992–2010
! Year
!
! Subject
! Party
! Votes
! %
!
! Opponent
! Party
! Votes
! %
!
! Opponent
! Party
! Votes
! %
!
! Opponent
! Party
! Votes
! %
!
|-
|1992
||
| |Charles Rangel
| |Democratic, Liberal
| |105,011
| |95%
|
| |Jose Suero
| |Conservative
| |4,345
| |4%
|
|! style="background:#FF00FF; "|Jessie Fields
|! style="background:#FF00FF; "|New Alliance
|! style="background:#FF00FF; "|1,337
|! style="background:#FF00FF; "|1%
|
|
|
|
|
|
|-
|1994
||
| |Charles Rangel
| |Democratic, Liberal
| |77,830
| |97%
|
|! style="background:#FFFF00; "|Jose Suero
|! style="background:#FFFF00; "|Right to Life
|! style="background:#FFFF00; "|2,812
|! style="background:#FFFF00; "|3%
|
|
|
|
|
|
|
|
|
|
|
|-
|1996
||
| |Charles Rangel
| |Democratic, Liberal
| |113,898
| |91%
|
| |Edward Adams
| |Republican
| |5,951 
| |5%
|
| |Ruben Vargas
| |Conservative, Independence
| |3,896
| |3%
|
|! style="background:#FFFF00; "|Jose Suero
|! style="background:#FFFF00; "|Right to Life
|! style="background:#FFFF00; "|989
|! style="background:#FFFF00; "|1%
|
|-
|1998
||
| |Charles Rangel
| |Democratic, Liberal
| |90,424
| |93%
|
| |David Cunningham
| |Republican
| |5,633
| |5%
|
| |Patrick McManus
| |Conservative
| |1,082
| |1%
|
|
|
|
|
|
|-
|2000
||
| |Charles Rangel
| |Democratic, Liberal
| |130,161
| |92%
|
| |Jose Suero
| |Republican
| |7,346
| |5%
|
| |Dean Loren
| |Green
| |2,134
| |2%
|
|! style="background:#800080; "|Jessie Fields
|! style="background:#800080; "|Independence
|! style="background:#800080; "|1,051
|! style="background:#800080; "|1%
|
|-
|2002
||
| |Charles Rangel
| |Democratic, Working Families
| |153,099
| |91%
|
| |Kenneth Jefferson
| |Republican
| |12,355
| |7%
|
|! style="background:#800080; "|Jessie Fields
|! style="background:#800080; "|Independence
|! style="background:#800080; "|3,345
|! style="background:#800080; "|2%
|
|
|
|
|
|
|-
|2006
||
| |Charles Rangel
| |Democratic, Working Families
| |103,916
| |94%
|
| |Edward Daniels
| |Republican
| |6,592
| |6%
|
|
|
|
|
|
|
|
|
|
|
|-
|2008
||
| |Charles Rangel
| |Democratic, Working Families
| |177,151
| |89%
|
| |Edward Daniels
| |Republican
| |15,676
| |8%
|
| |Craig Schley
| |Vote People Change
| |3,708
| |2%
|
| |Martin Koppel
| |Socialist Workers
| |2,141
| |1%
|
|-
|2010
||
| |Charles Rangel
| |Democratic, Working Families
| |91,225
| |80%
|
| |Michel Faulkner
| |Republican, Conservative
| |11,754
| |10%
|
|! style="background:#800080; "|Craig Schley
|! style="background:#800080; "|Independence, Vote People Change
|! style="background:#800080; "|7,803
|! style="background:#800080; "|7%
|
| |Róger Calero
| |Socialist Workers
| |2,647
| |2%
|

|+ : Results 2012–2014
! Year
!
! Subject
! Party
! Votes
! %
!
! Opponent
! Party
! Votes
! %
!
! Opponent
! Party
! Votes
! %
!
|-
|2012
||
| |Charles Rangel
| |Democratic, Working Families
| |175,690
| |91%
|
| |Craig Schley
| |Republican
| |12,147
| |6%
|
| |Deborah Liatos
| |Socialist Workers
| |5,548
| |3%
|
|-
|2014
||
| |Charles Rangel
| |Democratic, Working Families
| |68,396
| |87%
|
| |Daniel Vila
| |Green
| |9,806
| |13%
|
|
|
|
|
|

References

Rangel, Charles